Brian Carl Lloyd Nordgren (23 October 1925 – 15 May 2007) was a New Zealand rugby league player who played professionally for Wigan.

Early years
Born in Greymouth in 1926, Nordgren grew up in a Christchurch orphanage. He successfully joined the Army in 1940, claiming to be almost 18. However, in 1944, while awaiting shipment to Europe, a family member revealed he was only 17, and he was discharged.

Playing career
Nordgren joined Ponsonby in 1944, scoring 5 tries. In the following season he scored 267 points in the Auckland Rugby League competition and represented Auckland. He was a champion sprinter and held the New Zealand junior 100 yard and 220 yard records.

Along with Ces Mountford he sensationally signed with Wigan in December 1945, catching the New Zealand Rugby League unawares as they had not realised a 1937 international transfer ban had lapsed in 1941.

Nordgren made his début for Wigan against Warrington on 3 April 1946 and went on to play in nine matches that season. During his time at Wigan he was the top try scorer in the 1949-50 season, with 57 tries, and played in two Challenge Cup finals in 1946 and 1951. Wigan lost to Wakefield Trinity in 1946 after Nordgren missed a long-range penalty goal, estimated by Nordgren to be about 54m. The team won the Challenge Cup in 1951, defeating Barrow.

He represented Other Nationalities against France in 1951 and retired in 1955, having played in 293 games and scored 1154 points from 312 tries and 109 goals.

County Cup Final appearances
Brian Nordgren played , i.e. number 2, in Wigan's 9-3 victory over Belle Vue Rangers in the 1946–47 Lancashire County Cup Final during the 1946–47 season at Station Road, Swinton on Saturday 26 October 1946, played , i.e. number 5, and scored a try in the 10-7 victory over Belle Vue Rangers in the 1947–48 Lancashire County Cup Final during the 1947–48 season at Wilderspool Stadium, Warrington on Saturday 1 November 1947, played  in the 14-8 victory over Warrington in the 1948–49 Lancashire County Cup Final during the 1948–49 season at Station Road, Swinton on Saturday 13 November 1948, played , and scored 4-tries in the 20-7 victory over Leigh in the 1949–50 Lancashire County Cup Final during the 1949–50 season at Wilderspool Stadium, Warrington on Saturday 29 October 1949, played , and scored 2-tries in the 28-5 victory over Warrington in the 1950–51 Lancashire County Cup Final during the 1950–51 season at Station Road, Swinton on Saturday 4 November 1950, played , and scored 2-tries in the 14-6 victory over Leigh in the 1951–52 Lancashire County Cup Final during the 1951–52 season at Station Road, Swinton on Saturday 27 October 1951, and played  in the 8-16 defeat by St. Helens in the 1953–54 Lancashire County Cup Final during the 1953–54 season at Station Road, Swinton on Saturday 24 October 1953.

Later years
Nordgren studied law at the University of Liverpool and was called to the bar in 1951. After retirement he returned to New Zealand and practiced law in Auckland and Hamilton. He also spent some time coaching Ponsonby.

References

1925 births
2007 deaths
20th-century New Zealand lawyers
Alumni of the University of Liverpool
Auckland rugby league team players
Members of the Bar of England and Wales
New Zealand military personnel of World War II
New Zealand rugby league coaches
New Zealand rugby league players
Ponsonby Ponies coaches
Ponsonby Ponies players
Rugby league players from Christchurch
Rugby league wingers
Wigan Warriors players